Outime, subtitled "a role playing game of alternate times", is a role-playing game published by Valhalla Simulation Games in 1983.

Description
Outime is a time-travel system with adventures on alternate Earths. The rules cover skills, combat, psionics, equipment, and a sample miniscenario.

Publication history
Outime was designed by Marc W. D. Tyrrell, and published by Valhalla Simulation Games in 1983 as a 16-page book with an outer folder.

Reception

References

Canadian role-playing games
Parallel universes in fiction
Role-playing games introduced in 1983
Time travel and multiple reality role-playing games